Bumpus Cove (formerly known as Bumpass Cove) is an unincorporated community in Unicoi and Washington Counties, Tennessee, United States. The community occupies a cove  of the same name between Embreeville Mountain on the west and Rich Mountain on the east.

References

Unincorporated communities in Unicoi County, Tennessee
Unincorporated communities in Washington County, Tennessee
Unincorporated communities in Tennessee